Ernesto Teodoro Moneta (September 20, 1833 in Milan, Kingdom of Lombardy–Venetia – February 10, 1918) was an Italian journalist, nationalist, revolutionary soldier and later a pacifist and Nobel Peace Prize Laureate. He adopted the motto In varietate unitas! which later inspired Motto of the European Union.

At age 15, Moneta participated in the "Five Days of Milan" (1848 uprising against Austrian rule). He later attended the military academy in Ivrea. In 1859 he joined Garibaldi's Expedition of the Thousand, and also fought in the ranks of the Italian army against the Austrians in 1866. 

Subsequently, he became an international peace activist. 

Between 1867 and 1896 he was editor of the Milan democratic paper Il Secolo, published by Edoardo Sonzogno. 

In 1890 he founded the Lombard  Association for Peace and Arbitration (Unione Lombarda per la Pace e l'Arbitrato), which called for disarmament and envisaged the creation of a League of Nations and Permanent Court of Arbitration. He won (with Louis Renault) the Nobel Peace Prize in 1907.

References

  including the Nobel Lecture, August 25, 1909 Peace and Law in the Italian Tradition
 Ernesto Teodoro Moneta Monograph at nobel-winners.com
 Nobel Lectures, Peace 1901-1925, Elsevier Publishing Company, Amsterdam.

External links

 Società per la pace e la giustizia internazionale. Founded by Ernesto Teodoro Moneta

1833 births
1918 deaths
Military personnel from Milan
Journalists from Milan
Nobel Peace Prize laureates
Italian Nobel laureates
Italian newspaper editors
Italian male journalists